Henry Reston known as Harry Reston (1913-1989) was a Scottish international lawn bowler.

Bowls career
He competed in the first World Bowls Championship in Kyeemagh, New South Wales, Australia in 1966  and won a bronze medal in the fours with Willie Adrain, Willie Dyet and Bert Thomson at the event. He also won a silver medal in the team event (Leonard Trophy).

He was part of the Scottish team that won the Leonard Cup in 1972 and won a silver medal in the fours.

Reston also won the 1978 Scottish National Bowls Championships singles title.

References

1913 births
1989 deaths
Scottish male bowls players